Luis Germán Cárdenas Amaya (born January 10, 1967) is a retired male road cyclist from Colombia.

Career

References
 

1967 births
Living people
Colombian male cyclists
Vuelta a Colombia stage winners
Place of birth missing (living people)